Chakal (altered spelling of the Portuguese word for jackal; chacal) is a blackened thrash metal band from Belo Horizonte, Brazil. The band formed in 1985 and has to date released five albums through Cogumelo Records. Its debut record, Abominable Anno Domini, has been described as an "influential, genre-defining" example of Brazilian heavy metal.

History
Chakal was formed in early 1985 by William Wiz (drums), Destroyer (bass), and Mark (guitars) in Belo Horizonte, home of such other influential bands as Mutilator, Holocausto, Sarcófago and Sepultura. Shortly after forming, it played the Metal BH II Festival, fronted by Sgôto, alongside Sarcófago, Sepultura, Sagrado Inferno, Armageddon and Sao Paulo's Minotauro. It followed this up with frequent local gigging, and saw a number of line-up changes, recruiting Vladimir Korg (vocals) and Pepeu Necromancer (both ex-Megathrash). The band produced its debut demo, Children Sacrifice, in 1986, featuring guest appearances from Max Cavalera of Sepultura and SDN of Mutilator. It also contributed two tracks to Cogumelo Records' Warfare Noise I compilation the same year ("Cursed Cross" and "Mr. Jesus Christ").

By the time of its debut album, Abominable Anno Domini, Chakal's line-up had settled down to Vladimir Korg on vocals (also credited with the lyrics to Sepultura's "To the Wall"), guitarists Mark and Pepeu, bassist Marcelo Laranja, and drummer William Wiz. The album was recorded in August 1987 at Belo Horizonte's JG Studios. According to Eduardo Rivadavia of Allmusic, the band's debut "turned out to be one of the most vicious, extreme but accomplished Brazilian thrash/black metal albums released in the landmark year of 1987". The album was reissued in 2005 by Cogumelo with bonus tracks from 1988's Living with the Pigs single, originally recorded at JG Studios in October 1988. Shortly after the Abominable Anno Domini sessions, Pepeu left the band.

Korg also left in April 1989 to join The Mist, leaving Laranja to assume vocal duties; Eduardo Simões was also drafted in on guitar. However, these line-up changes interfered with the band's ability to capitalise on the success of its debut, with extended periods of inactivity. Nonetheless, it released a further two albums, 1990's The Man Is His Own Jackal and 1993's Death Is a Lonely Business, before a hiatus of nearly a decade.

In 2002 the band reunited with Korg to play a few shows, and over the course of two years wrote material for a new album based on a screenplay written by Korg and inspired by George A. Romero's Living Dead film series. After a long period of rehearsals and pre-productions, the result was the album Deadland, released in 2003. Also influenced by comics and RPGs, the album came with a multimedia track with lyrics, photos and other information. The album release was followed by a Brazilian tour dubbed the Dead Man Walking Tour. A further album, Demon King, was released in 2004, seeing the return of Mark to guitar duties and a cover of Death's "Evil Dead". The self-released sixth album Destroy! Destroy! Destroy! came out on 16 November 2013, featuring the line-up of Vladimir Korg, Andrevil, Wiz, Mark and Cassio Corsino on bass.

Korg left to reform The Mist.

Marcelo Laranja returned to the band to work on the new album.

In 2017 they re-recorded The Man is His Own Jackal, releasing the new recording as Man is a Jackal 2 Man.

They showed new songs in Cogumelo Quarentine Sessions. The song The Enemy is on YouTube.

Current line-up
 André (guitar and vocals)
 William Wiz (drums)
 Mark (guitar)

Previous members
 Vladimir Korg (vocals)
 Cassio Corsino (bass)
 Marcelo Laranja (bass)
 Destroyer (bass)
 Giulano Toniolo (bass)
 Drews (bass)
 Eduardo Paulista S. (guitar)
 Stanley (guitar)
 Pepeu (guitar)
 Sgoto (vocals)
 Sergio (vocals)

Discography
 Children Sacrifice (demo, 1986)
 Warfare Noise I (split LP with Mutilator, Holocausto and Sarcófago; Cogumelo, 1986)
 Abominable Anno Domini LP (Cogumelo, 1987)
 Living with the Pigs EP (Cogumelo, 1988)
 The Man Is His Own Jackal LP (Cogumelo, 1990)
 Death Is a Lonely Business LP (Cogumelo, 1993)
 Deadland LP (Cogumelo, 2003)
 Demon King LP (Cogumelo, 2004)
 Destroy! Destroy! Destroy! (self-released, 2013)
 Man is a Jackal 2 Man (Cogumelo, 2018)

References

External links
 Chakal @ Myspace
 
 

Brazilian black metal musical groups
Brazilian thrash metal musical groups
Musical groups established in 1985
1985 establishments in Brazil